Filgrave is a hamlet in the unitary authority area of the City of Milton Keynes, Buckinghamshire, England.
 It is about three miles north of Newport Pagnell.

The hamlet name is an Old English language word, and means 'Fygla's grove'.  In manorial rolls of 1241 it was listed as Filegrave.

Civil parish
Together with its neighbouring village, it forms the civil parish of Tyringham and Filgrave.

References

External links

Hamlets in Buckinghamshire
Areas of Milton Keynes